Riverside is a ghost town in Burt County, Nebraska, United States.

History
A post office was established at Riverside in 1870, and remained in operation until it was discontinued in 1875.

References

Geography of Burt County, Nebraska